Jeffrey D. Dunn is an American broadcast executive who was the president and CEO of Sesame Workshop until 2021, the non-profit organization best known for making Sesame Street. He previously served as the President and CEO of the HiT Entertainment from 2008 until it was sold to Mattel in 2012.

In 2014, Dunn served as a Fellow at the Harvard University Advanced Leadership Initiative.

Prior to leading HiT, Dunn was the Chief Operating Officer of Nickelodeon and the President of Nickelodeon Film and Enterprises. Prior to joining Nickelodeon, Dunn was in charge of marketing for The Bank of Boston. Dunn began his career at Time Magazine, where he served in a variety of marketing and general management positions.

Early life
Dunn was raised in West Hartford, CT, where he graduated magna cum laude from the Kingswood School in 1973. During his senior year of high school, Dunn served as the Editorial Supervisor for The Kingswood News and interned at the Hartford Courant, where he wrote daily obituaries. He received his AB degree cum laude from Harvard College in 1977, where he majored in American political history, and he received his MBA degree in 1981 from the Harvard Graduate School of Business Administration, where he was named by the faculty to the Century Club as one of the top leaders of his class.

Personal life
Dunn is married to the former Karen Denuzze of New Britain, CT, and they have two sons.

References

Living people
American businesspeople
Harvard Business School alumni
Harvard College alumni
Year of birth missing (living people)
HIT Entertainment
Nickelodeon executives